Nadimpalli Seetharamaraju is a Telugu language journalist. He appears on all major Telugu news channels for his political and policy analysis.

References

Telugu-language journalists
Living people
Indian male journalists
Year of birth missing (living people)